The Conference  of NGOs (CoNGO; full "Conference of Non-Governmental Organizations in Consultative Relationship with the United Nations") "is an independent, international, non-profit membership association of non-governmental organizations (NGOs). It facilitates the participation of NGOs in United Nations debates and decision-making."

The two classes of membership, Full, for those NGOs with consultative status with the United Nations Economic and Social Council, and Associate, for those with affiliation with a UN programme or agency, total more than 500 members.

Founded in 1948, CoNGO has committees based in Geneva, New York and Vienna. Its objectives: "to ensure that NGOs be present when governments discuss issues of global concern at the United Nations and to facilitate NGO discussions on such issues."

Funding
The CoNGO 2005 report lists funding, coming mainly from the Swiss Agency for Development and Cooperation, the Canadian Government, the International Telecommunication Union and membership dues, in total nearly US$490,000.

References

External links
 List of Full CoNGO members

Conference
Conference
International organizations based in the United States
United Nations relations